Codex Regius, designated by siglum L or 019 (in the Gregory-Aland numbering of New Testament manuscripts), ε56 (in the von Soden numbering of New Testament manuscripts), is a Greek uncial manuscript of the New Testament written on parchment. Using the study of comparative writing styles (palaeography), it has been assigned to the 8th century. The manuscript has several gaps. Textual critic Frederick H. A.  Scrivener described it as "by far the most remarkable document of its age and class."

Description 
The manuscript is a codex (precursor to the modern book), made of 257 thick parchment leaves, containing an almost complete text of the four Gospels, with the following portions missing due to the loss of leaves/pages: Matt 4:22-5:14, 28:17-20, Mark 10:16-30, 15:2-20, John 21:15-25.

The text is written in two columns per page, 25 lines per page, in large but not rounded uncial letters. It has breathing marks (utilised to designate vowel emphasis), and accents (used to indicate voiced pitch changes) often added wrongly. Scrivener describes it as "carelessly written by an ignorant scribe". According to him the letter φ (phi) is enormously large, and the letter α (alpha) presents the last stage of the uncial script. He also surmises it was badly written by the copyist, who was probably more Egyptian rather than Greek, who had a tendency for writing Coptic rather than Greek letters.

The text is divided according to the chapters (known as  / kephalaia), whose numbers are given in the margin, and their titles (known as  / titloi) written at the top of the pages. It also contains the table of contents (also known as ) before each Gospel. There is also another division according to the Ammonian sections, with references to the Eusebian Canons (an early system of dividing the four Gospels into different sections) in the margin. Lectionary markings are contained in the margin for liturgical readings (these being dates in the yearly Church calendar where specific passages are read).

It has two endings to the Gospel of Mark (as in codices Ψ 099 0112 274 579 Lectionary 1602), and John 7:53-8:11 is omitted.

Text 
The Greek text of this codex has been considered a representative of the Alexandrian text-type in its late stadium.  The text-types are groups of different New Testament manuscripts which share specific or generally related readings, which then differ from each other group, and thus the conflicting readings can separate out the groups. These are then used to determine the original text as published; there are three main groups with names: Alexandrian, Western, and Byzantine. It contains a large number of Byzantine readings in the Gospel of Matthew (1:1–17:26). Textual critic Kurt Aland placed it in Category II of his New Testament classification system. Category II manuscripts are described as being manuscripts "of a special quality, i.e., manuscripts with a considerable proportion of the early text, but which are marked by alien influences. These influences are usually of smoother, improved readings, and in later periods by infiltration by the Byzantine text." According to Wisse, who examined Luke 1; 10; 20, the text is a "core member" of the Alexandrian text. It was noted in the 19th century that there is strong resemblance to Codex Vaticanus (B), to the citations of Origen, and to the marginal readings of the Harklean Syriac.

 Omissions

omit - L  B 1009 ℓ 12 ff k syr cop)
incl. - Majority of manuscripts

 (and be baptized with the baptism that I am baptized with) - L  B D Z Θ 085 ƒ ƒ it syr cop

 (desert) 
omit - L B ℓ 184
incl. - Majority of manuscripts

 (and He said: "You do not know what manner of spirit you are of; for the Son of man came not to destroy men's lives but to save them) - L  B C Θ Ξ 33 700 892 1241 syr, cop

 (but deliver us from evil) - L   B ƒ 700 vg syr cop arm geo.

 Additions

 - L * D W Θ ƒ 1010 it vg
 - Majority of manuscripts

 (the other took a spear and pierced His side, and immediately came out water and blood see ) - L  B C Γ 1010 1293 vg)
omit - Majority of manuscripts 

 - L  C* D Ψ 0100 ƒ it vg syr cop cop
 - Majority of manuscripts

 Some other readings

 - L W ƒ Byz
  B C

 
 (teacher) - L  B D ƒ 892 1010 1365 ℓ 5 it cop eth geo Origen, Hilary.

 (manifold) - L B 1010
 (hundredfold) - Majority of manuscripts

 (and opened the book) - L A B W Ξ 33 892 1195 1241 ℓ 547 sy sa bo
 (and unrolled the book) -  D K Δ Θ Π Ψ ƒ ƒ 28 565 700 1009 1010 Byz

 - L  K X Π Ψ ƒ ƒ 33 892 1071 ℓ 547
 - Majority of manuscripts

 - L D
 - Majority of manuscripts

It contains  (the agony), omitted by other Alexandrian witnesses.

History 

The text of the codex was cited by Robert Estienne as η' in his Editio Regia (an early edition of the Greek New Testament). It was loosely collated by textual critic Johann Jakob Wettstein. Textual critic Johann Jakob Griesbach set a very high value on the codex. It was edited in 1846 by textual critic Constantin von Tischendorf (in the publication Monumenta sacra inedita), but with some errors.

The codex is now located in the National Library of France (Gr. 62), in Paris.

See also 

 List of New Testament uncials
 Textual criticism

References

Further reading 
 Constantin von Tischendorf, Monumenta sacra inedita (Leipzig 1846), pp. 15–24, 57-399.
 Henri Omont, Fac-similés des plus anciens manuscrits grecs de la Bibliothèque nationale du IVe et XIIIe siecle (Paris 1892).

External links 

 Codex Regius L (019): at the Encyclopedia of Textual Criticism
 Agreement L/019 with B/03, D/05, Θ/038 and majority in the Gospel of Matthew wordpress.com
 Grec 62: Codex Regius online at the Bibliothèque nationale de France

Greek New Testament uncials
8th-century biblical manuscripts
Bibliothèque nationale de France collections